William Walling may refer to:

 William English Walling, American socialist and labor reformer and co-founder of the NAACP
 William H. Walling, Medal of Honor recipient
 Will Walling, character actor in 1920s films, sometimes credited as William Walling